Storm of Steel (original English title: In Storms of Steel) is the memoir of German officer Ernst Jünger's experiences on the Western Front during the First World War from December 1914 to August 1918. 

It was originally printed privately in 1920, making it one of the first personal accounts to be published. The book is a graphic account of trench warfare. It was largely devoid of editorialization when first published, but was heavily revised several times. The book established Jünger's fame as a writer in the 1920s. The judgment of contemporaries and later critics reflects the ambivalence of the work, which describes the war in all its brutality, but neither expressly condemns it nor goes into its political causes. It can be read affirmatively, neutrally or as an anti-war book.

Plot
Storm of Steel begins with Jünger as a private entering the line with the 73rd Hanoverian Regiment in Champagne. His first taste of combat came at Les Éparges in April 1915 where he was first wounded.

After recuperating, he took an officer's course and achieved the rank of Leutnant. He rejoined his regiment on the Arras sector. In 1916, with the Battle of the Somme underway, Jünger's regiment moved to Combles in August for the defence of the village of Guillemont. Here Jünger was wounded again, and absent shortly before the final British assault which captured the village — his platoon was annihilated.  In 1917 Jünger saw action during the Battle of Arras in April, the Third Battle of Ypres in July and October, and the German counter-attack during the Battle of Cambrai in November. Jünger led a company of assault troops during the final German spring offensive, 21 March 1918 when he was wounded again. On 23 August he suffered his most severe wound when he was shot through the chest.

In total, Jünger was wounded 14 times during the war, including five bullet wounds and earned Golden Wound Badge. He was awarded the Iron Cross 1st and 2nd Class, House Order of Hohenzollern and was the youngest ever recipient of the Pour le Mérite.

Publication history
The first version of Storm of Steel was essentially Jünger's unedited diary; the original English title was In Storms of Steel: from the diary of a Shock Troop Commander, Ernst Jünger, War Volunteer, and subsequently Lieutenant in the Rifle Regiment of Prince Albrecht of Prussia (73rd Hanoverian Regiment).  Since it was first published there have been up to seven revisions of Storm of Steel, with the last being the 1978 version for Jünger's Collected Works.  The major revision came in 1934, for which the explicit descriptions of violence were muted.  This edition carried the universal dedication For the fallen.

The first translation came out in 1922 with Julio A. López's Spanish translation titled Bajo la tormenta de acero and based on the original 1920 edition. The 1924 edition was translated into English by Basil Creighton as The Storm of Steel  in 1929 and into French in 1930.  A new English translation, based on the final 1961 version, was made by Michael Hofmann in 2003 which won the 2004 Oxford-Weidenfeld Translation Prize. In his introduction to his own edition, Hofmann is highly critical of Creighton's translation.

Translations 
 Bajo la tormenta de acero, translation into Spanish by Julio A. López, Biblioteca del Suboficial 15, Círculo Militar, Buenos Aires 1922.
 The Storm of Steel, translation into English by Basil Creighton, Chatto & Windus, London 1929.
 Orages d'acier. Souvenirs du front de France (1914–1918), translation into French by F. Grenier, Payot, Paris 1930.
 Kōtetsu no arashi, translation into Japanese by Satō Masao, Senshin-sha, Tokyo, 1930.
 Tempestades de acero, translation into Spanish by Mario Verdaguer, Iberia, Barcelona 1930.
 Książę piechoty. W nawałnicy żelaza, translation into Polish by J. Gaładyk, Warszawa 1935.
 Prin furtuni de oţel. Translation into Romanian by Victor Timeu, 1935.
 Orages d'acier. Journal de guerre, translation into French Henri Plard, Plon, Paris 1960.
 Tempeste d'acciaio, translation into Italian by Giorgio Zampaglione, Edizioni del Borghese, Roma 1961.
 Nelle tempeste d'acciaio, translation into Italian by Giorgio Zampaglione, Collana Biblioteca della Fenice, Parma, Guanda, 1990.
 Tempeste d'acciaio, translation into Italian by Gisela Jaager-Grassi, Collezione Biblioteca n.94, Pordenone, Edizioni Studio Tesi, 1990.
 I stålstormer, translation into Norwegian by Pål Norheim and Jon-Alfred Smith, Tiden norsk förlag, Oslo 1997; 2010 as I en storm av stål: Dagbok fra Vestfronten 1915–1918, Vega Forlag, Oslo 2010.
 W stalowych burzach, translation into Polish by Wojciech Kunicki, Warszawa 1999.
 В стальных грозах, translation into Russian by Н. О. Гучинская, В. Г. Ноткина, Владимир Даль, СПб. 2000.
 Oorlogsroes, translation into Dutch by Nelleke van Maaren, De Arbeiderspers, Amsterdam 2002.
 Storm of Steel, translation into English by Michael Hofmann, Penguin Books, London 2003.
 Tempestades de acero, translation into Spanish by Andrés Sánchez Pascual, Tusquets, Barcelona 2005.
 Teräsmyrskyssä, translation into Finnish by Markus Lång, Ajatus Kirjat, Helsinki 2008.
 I stålstormen, translation into Swedish by Urban Lindström, Bokförlaget Atlantis, Stockholm 2008.
 Orages d'acier, rev. translation into French by Julien Hervier, Gallimard, Paris 2008.
 Tempestades de aço, translation into Portuguese by Marcelo Backes, Cosac & Naify, São Paulo, 2013.
 I stålstormen, translation into Danish by Adam Paulsen and Henrik Rundqvist, Gyldendal, Kopenhagen 2014.
 Acélzivatarban, translation into Hungarian by Csejtei Dezső and Juhász Anikó, Noran Libro Kiadó, Budapest 2014.
 В сталевих грозах, translation into Ukrainian by Юрко Прохасько (Yurko Prokhasko), Чернівці (Chernivtsi), Kyiv, 2014.
 Plieno audrose, translation into Lithuanian by Laurynas Katkus, Kitos knygos, Vilnius 2016.
 În furtuni de oțel, translation into Romanian by Viorica Nişcov, Corint, Bucharest, 2017.
 Çelik fırtınalarında, translation into Turkish by Tevfik Turan, Jaguar Kitap, Istanbul 2019.
 In Storms of Steel, translation into English by Kasey James Elliott, 2021.

See also
All Quiet on the Western Front

References

External links
 

1920 non-fiction books
Works by Ernst Jünger
Chatto & Windus books
Personal accounts of World War I
Self-published books